Joan Tipon (born April 9, 1982) is a Filipino amateur boxer who won the gold medal at the 2006 Doha Asian Games in the bantamweight (under 54 kg.) division. He is a native of the province of Negros Occidental.

Career
Tipon also competed at the 2005 Southeast Asian Games held in  Bacolod, Philippines and won the gold medal in the same division against Tangtong Klongjian of Thailand 24-5.

At the Asian Games 2006 he upset Worapoj Petchkoom and beat  Han Soon Chul of Korea in the final 21-10.

At the World Championships 2007 he lost in the first round against Worapoj Petchkoom 5:13.

As of 2012, Tipon is now a full time trainer for people who wanted to play boxing. He stated that: "Gusto kong magustuhan ng tao ang paglalaro ng boxing kasabay nito ay ang Ibahagi sa kanila ang salita ng Diyos" ("I'd like people to enjoy the sport of boxing and at the same time Share with them the word of God ")

References

1982 births
Living people
Boxers from Negros Occidental
Asian Games medalists in boxing
Boxers at the 2006 Asian Games
Filipino male boxers
Asian Games gold medalists for the Philippines
Medalists at the 2006 Asian Games
Southeast Asian Games medalists in boxing
Southeast Asian Games gold medalists for the Philippines
Competitors at the 2005 Southeast Asian Games
Bantamweight boxers